4Q521 or the 4QMessianic Apocalypse is one of the Dead Sea Scrolls found in the Cave 4 near Qumran.

Description
4Q521 comprises two larger fragments. The original editor was Jean Starcky, though translation revisions have been proposed by Émile Puech.

Text
The text:

Analysis
The subject of the text is eschatological and makes a connection with the healing ministry of the Messiah. 4Q521 may be related to other apocalyptic end-time texts, 4QSecond Ezekiel 4QApocryphon of Daniel, and has been studied in relation to Gospel of Luke's Messianic Magnificat and Benedictus and especially striking is the comparison with  about raising the dead.

The references to heaven and earth listening to the Messiah are not paralleled in any other text in the context of Second Temple Judaism and have given speculation as to the heavenly status of the Messiah in this text. Some see it as an allusion to a which says "Hear, O heavens, and listen, O earth; for the Lord has spoken". There is also some dispute among scholars as to whether the Greek "anointed one" should be read in the defective plural as "anointed ones", which would form a parallelism to the second half of the first line to the "holy ones" (angels) and imply that both halves of the text are referring to angelic figures, rather than a Messiah.

The Messiah/anointed figure in 4Q521 is commonly interpreted as an Elijah-type figure rather than a Davidic warrior Messiah. In the Dead Sea Scrolls, Hebrew prophets, such as Elijah, are regularly referred to as "anointed ones". Furthermore, it is the role of a herald or messenger to "bring good news to the poor" (line 12), suggesting a prophetic rather than warrior figure. Only in 4Q521 does an ancient Jewish text say the Messiah will raise the dead in the eternal kingdom (line 12) (even in the New Testament, Jesus is the firstfruit but not the agent of the final resurrection). Rather, raising the dead was most commonly associated with the historical career of Elijah, and later Jewish commentary solely placed the role of resurrection in God's future kingdom with Elijah. For example, "the resurrection of the dead comes through Elijah" (m. Sota 9, end; j . Sheqalim 3:3) and "Everything that the Holy One will do, he has already anticipated by the hands of the righteous in this world, the resurrection of the dead by Elijah and Ezekiel, the drying of the Dead Sea by Moses..." (Pesikta de R. Kahana 76a). The description of Elijah in Ben Sira provides a direct parallel with 4Q521's reference to the Messiah commanding the heavens and the earth, where, through the authority of God, Elijah himself commands the heavens: "By the word of the Lord he shut up the heavens and also three times brought down fire" (Sira 48:3). The two trees in Revelation 11 that prevent rainfall are also commonly interpreted as symbols for Elijah and Moses. Sirach 48:10 also cites Malachi 3:24 when describing Elijah.

See also
Luke 1

References

External links
 Original text and translation
 Comparison between 4Q521 and early Gospel tradition by James Tabor

Dead Sea Scrolls